Cyd is a given name, and may refer to:
Cyd Adams (1949–2005), American poet and academic
Cyd Charisse (1922–2008), American dancer and actress
Cyd Gray (born 1973), Trinidad and Tobago footballer
Cyd Hayman (born 1944), English actress
Cyd Ho (born 1954), full-time legislative councillor of Hong Kong's Legislative Council
Cyd Zeigler Jr (born 1973), American sportswriter

In fiction:
 Cyd Sherman, more commonly referred to by her in-game alias "Codex", the central character of web series The Guild

See also
CYD
CyD

Unisex given names
Nicknames